Orders Are Orders is a 1932 comedy play by the British writers Ian Hay and Anthony Armstrong. A Hollywood film crew takes over a British Army barracks for a film shoot, with chaotic consequences.

It premiered at the King's Theatre in Southsea, before transferring to the Shaftesbury Theatre in London's West End where it ran for 193 performances from 8 August 1932 to 21 January 1933. The cast included Reginald Purdell, Marjorie Corbett, Kathleen Kelly, Olive Blakeney and Michael Shepley.

Film adaptation
In 1933 it was made into a film Orders Is Orders by Gainsborough Pictures, directed by Walter Forde and starring Charlotte Greenwood, James Gleason and Ian Hunter. In 1955 this was remade into the film Orders Are Orders.

References

Bibliography
 Goble, Alan. The Complete Index to Literary Sources in Film. Walter de Gruyter, 1999.
 Wearing, J.P. The London Stage 1930-1939: A Calendar of Productions, Performers, and Personnel.  Rowman & Littlefield, 2014.

1932 plays
Plays by Ian Hay
British plays adapted into films
West End plays
Comedy plays